Edakkazhiyoor  is a place in Punnayur Panchayat at Thrissur district in the state of Kerala, India on the sides of NH66 formerly H17 (Chavakkad - Ponnani). Edakkazhiyur has BSNL Telephone Exchange (0487- 2615…) under Thrissur SDCA. Edakkazhiyoor central Juma Masjid (Munavirul Iqhvan Sangham), Sankaranarayana temple, Marine World Public Aquarium, Greeny paddy fields, Canoli Canal, Affiance Beach Park and Peaceful Virgin beaches in Edakkazhiyoor famous for its scenic beauty and Fishing.

Punnayur Branch of State Bank of India (SBI), South Indian Bank (SIB), Seethi Sahib Memorial Higher Secondary School (SSMVHSS), Public Health Center (Govt) is located at Edakkazhiyoor serving for the region. 

http://marineworld.in/ CISO MARINE WORLD is  India's largest Public Aquarium, Marine World is located at Edakkazhiyoor Chavakkad, Thrissur

Demographics
 India census, Edakkazhiyur had a population of 15553 with 7540 males and 8013 females.

References

Villages in Thrissur district